Ermanno Fasoli (born 9 November 1943) is an Italian boxer. He competed in the men's light welterweight event at the 1964 Summer Olympics.

References

External links
 

1943 births
Living people
Italian male boxers
Olympic boxers of Italy
Boxers at the 1964 Summer Olympics
Sportspeople from Lecco
Light-welterweight boxers